CNS Neuroscience & Therapeutics is a bimonthly medical journal published 1995 by Wiley-Blackwell addressing topics in neurology and central nervous system therapeutic pharmacology. It was established in 1995 as CNS Drug Reviews and obtained its current title in 2008.

External links 
 

Neurology journals
Pharmacology journals
Wiley-Blackwell academic journals
English-language journals
Bimonthly journals